The 2014–15 Serbian Cup season was the ninth season of the Serbian national football tournament.

The competition started on 3 September 2014 and concluded with the Final on 20 May 2015.

The winner of the competition qualified for the 2015–16 UEFA Europa League.

Calendar

Preliminary round
A preliminary round was held in order to reduce the number of teams competing in the next round to 32. It consisted of 4 single-legged ties (due to the fact that Smederevo was dissolved leaving a vacancy in the preliminary round), with a penalty shoot-out as the decider, if the score was tied after 90 minutes. The bottom 5 teams from the 2013–14 Serbian First League took part, as well as the 4 regional cup winners and a Kosovo and Metohija representative. The draw contained seeded and unseeded teams. The bottom 5 teams from the 2013–14 Serbian First League (Inđija, Timok, Dolina, Teleoptik and Smederevo) were set as unseeded teams, with the 4 regional cup winners (Dorćol, Semendria 1924, Moravac Mrštane and ČSK Čelarevo) and the Kosovo and Metohija representative being set as seeded teams. The draw was held on 30 August 2014, and was regionalised to minimise expenses for the participating clubs. Because Smederevo withdrew from the cup, the Kosovo and Metohija representative received an automatic bye to the First round. The matches were played on 3 September 2014. In total, around 1250 spectators attended the games (average 313 per game).

Round of 32
In this round, five winners from the previous round (Dorćol (III), Semendria 1924 (III), Moravac Mrštane (II), Inđija (II) and Kosovo and Metohija representative (Trepča (IV), not known at moment of draw)) are joined by all 16 teams from Serbian Superliga from 2013–14, as well as top 11 teams from Serbian First League from 2013–14. The draw was conducted on 10 September 2014 and it contained seeded (16 teams from 2013–14 Serbian SuperLiga) and unseeded teams. The matches were played on 24 September 2014. No extra time was played if the score was tied after regular 90 minutes, with those games going straight into penalties. In total, around 22500 spectators attended the games(avg. 1406 per game).

Round of 16
16 winners from first round took part in this stage of the competition. The draw was held on 6 October 2014, and it contained seeded and unseeded teams. Seeded teams: Red Star Belgrade, Partizan, Jagodina, Vojvodina, Čukarički, Radnički Niš, Voždovac and Spartak Subotica. Unseeded teams: OFK Beograd, Radnički 1923, Rad, Sloboda Užice (II), Metalac Gornji Milanovac (II), Sloga Petrovac (II), Proleter Novi Sad (II) and Inđija (II). Seedings were determined by last seasons final standings in top two Serbian divisions. The matches were played on 29 October and 19 November 2014. No extra time was played if the score was tied after regular 90 minutes, with games going straight into penalties. In total, around 6850 spectators attended the games(avg. 856 per game).

Quarter-finals
8 winners from second round took part in this stage of the competition. The draw contained seeded and unseeded teams. Seedings were determined by following key: Last season's cup semifinalists were automatically set as seeded teams, with remaining seeds determined by last season final standings in top two Serbian divisions. Seeded teams: Vojvodina, Jagodina, Spartak Subotica and Partizan. Unseeded teams: Čukarički, Radnički Niš, Voždovac, Rad. The matches were played on 3 December 2014. In total, around 3250 spectators attended the games(avg. 813 per game).

Semi-finals
4 winners from Quarter finals (Jagodina, Partizan, Čukarički and Voždovac) took part in the semi-finals. The draw was held on 5 December 2014. There were no seedings in the draw. Semi-finals were contested over two legs. Aggregate winners qualified for the Cup finals. First legs were played on 18 March 2015, and second legs were played on 8 April 2015. In total, around 5600 spectators attended the games(avg. 1400 per game).

|}

First legs

Second legs

Final
2 winners from Semi-finals took part in the single-legged final. The final game was played on 20 May 2015.

References

External links
 Official site

Serbian Cup seasons
Cup
Serbian Cup